Scopula succrassula is a moth of the  family Geometridae. It is found on the Philippines (Mindanao, Palawan) and Borneo.

References

Moths described in 1931
succrassula
Moths of Asia